Two track may refer to:
Trail
Double track in rail transport
A method of multitrack recording using only two audio channels